Magic Hotel is the second album by English band Toploader. Released in 2002, it is a follow-up to their successful 1999 album Onka's Big Moka. The album title is a reference to a Los Angeles hotel where the band lived while recording the album. 

Critical reviews were harshly negative, and sales of the album were disappointing compared to their debut. As a result Toploader was dropped by S2 Records, and the band broke up before reforming in 2009.

Track listing 
"Time of My Life" – 03:35
"Cloud 9" – 03:34
"Never Forgotten" – 03:31
"Leave Me Be" – 03:29
"Lady Let Me Shine" – 05:02
"Stupid Games" – 03:29
"Following The Sun" - 03:08
"Only Desire" – 04:03
"Promised Tide" – 04:14
"The Midas Touch" – 05:27
"Some Kind of Wonderful" - 03:13

References

2002 albums
Albums produced by Stargate
Toploader albums